Bruce Goldsmith is a British paraglider pilot, paraglider designer, and the 2007 Paragliding World Champion. He won the title at Manilla in Australia, flying an Airwave Magic FR3.

He has been British champion three times, most recently in 2004.  He has also been British hang gliding champion twice.

Goldsmith is by profession a civil engineer, who started designing hang gliders in 1979 and paragliders in 1989  and was the designer of paragliders for Airwave Gliders for 20 years and designed the Magic, Scenic, Sport, Ten and the Wave. He set up the paragliding division of Airwave - which was already a manufacturer of hang gliders - in 1989. He left to found Ozone Paragliders in 1999, but returned to Airwave in 2000. He moved to the Swiss paraglider manufacturer Advance Thun in 2010 and has now set up a brand under his own name: Bruce Goldsmith Design.

He lives in the south of France with his wife Arna and their three children.

Bruce Goldsmith Design

In 2013, Bruce Goldsmith released his first EN-C paraglider 'Tala' under his own label Bruce Goldsmith Design. 
This has been followed by Wasp (EN-B), Luna (paramotor) and Dual (tandem) paragliders in 2013 and Adam (EN-A) in 2014. In 2015 the Base (EN-B) was launched and the Cure (EN-C) was presented at the Coupe Icare in September.

See also
 Paragliding

References

Hang gliding
Paraglider pilots
Year of birth missing (living people)
Living people